"Lookin' for a Good Time" is a song recorded by American country music trio Lady Antebellum. It was released on June 9, 2008, as the second single from their self-titled debut studio album, as well as their second top 20 hit on the Billboard country chart. The song was co-written by the trio's three members; Hillary Scott, Charles Kelley, and Dave Haywood along with Keith Follesé, and it features lead vocals from both Scott and Kelley.

Critical reception
"Lookin' for a Good Time" received a "thumbs up" review from the country music site Engine 145. Although reviewer Matt C. called the storyline "fairly pedestrian" and said that the producers "[did] their best to ruin" the song, he also made note of Kelley's "distinctive, husky voice" and the alternating lead vocals, adding "I’m not likely to confuse this group with any other artist on country radio."

The song was also distributed as a downloadable song in the game Tap Tap Revenge for the iPhone OS

Music video
The music video was directed by Chris Hicky. The video shows the band performing the song on a TV show and is set in the 1950/60's based on the band and audience's clothes. One difference between the video and the album version of the song is, in the video they sing "would you get the wrong impression if I asked you to dance right now" instead of "would you get the wrong impression if I called us a cab right now".

Credits and Personnel
The following musicians perform on this track:
Chad Cromwell – drums, tambourine
Larry Franklin – fiddle
Jason "Slim" Gambill – electric guitar
Dave Haywood – acoustic guitar, background vocals
Charles Kelley – lead vocals
Rob McNelley – electric guitar
Michael Rojas – Hammond B-3 organ
Hillary Scott – lead vocals
Paul Worley – electric guitar
Craig Young – bass guitar

Chart performance
The song debuted at number 60 on the U.S. Billboard Hot Country Songs chart dated June 21, 2008 and peaked at number 11 in December 2008.

Awards and nominations
2010 CMT Music Awards: CMT Performance of the Year, "Lookin' For a Good Time" from the 2009 CMT Music Awards, Nominated

References

2008 singles
2008 songs
Lady A songs
Song recordings produced by Paul Worley
Songs written by Keith Follesé
Songs written by Dave Haywood
Songs written by Charles Kelley
Songs written by Hillary Scott
Music videos directed by Chris Hicky
Capitol Records Nashville singles